Gülşen Bubikoğlu (born 5 December 1954) is a Turkish actress, one of the leading ladies of Turkish cinema in the 1970s and into the early 1980s. She studied at Fatih Kız Lisesi and was a fashion model for a time. Her first leading role was in Yaban in 1973. She and Tarik Akan formed one of the most recognised couples on the screen in the Turkish film history having acted in many romantic comedies together. She starred in many films of famous director Türker İnanoğlu, whom she married later.

Filmography

References

External links 
 
 SinemaTürk.com - Profile of Gülşen Bubikoğlu
 

1954 births
Actresses from Istanbul
Living people
Turkish film actresses
Turkish female models
Best Actress Golden Orange Award winners
Golden Orange Life Achievement Award winners
20th-century Turkish actresses